Old English metre is the conventional name given to the poetic metre in which English language poetry was composed in the Anglo-Saxon period. The best-known example of poetry composed in this verse form is Beowulf, but the vast majority of Old English poetry belongs to the same tradition. The most salient feature of Old English poetry is its heavy use of alliteration.

Alliteration 
The basic Anglo-Saxon poetic line consists of two half-lines, connected by alliteration. This means that there is a word or syllable in the second half-line, which will alliterate with one or more important words or syllables in the first half-line. These alliterated words or syllables will have more stress. Consonants will always alliterate with consonants, but a vowel is allowed to alliterate with any other vowel. As in all Old English poetry, the alliterative form can be seen in the "Finnsburg Fragment" (alliterated sounds are in bold):

Ac onwacnigeað nū, wīgend mīne 
"But awake now, my warriors,"

ealra ǣrest eorðbūendra,
of all first the men

The words that contain alliterated syllables are also very important because not all syllables can be alliterated. There is a hierarchy of alliteration; nouns and verbs are almost consistently alliterated whereas ‘helping’ words such as pronouns and prepositions are almost never alliterated. The alliteration and positioning of these syllables are what help assign stress to certain words and not others.

Stress 

After we find the alliterative syllables in the two half-lines, we can assign stress according to their position and length of the syllables. This stress, or arsis, is usually placed on a syllable containing a long vowel. The stressed syllables are ordered along the same basic hierarchy of the alliteration; it is very rare that a stressed syllable would be a preposition or pronoun. Words such as God, King, and proper nouns are very frequently stressed.

After we apply stresses to the appropriate syllables, we must find the unstressed and secondary-stressed syllables. The unstressed, or thesis, syllables are usually short, and frequently on the words that are lower in the hierarchy. Secondary stresses occur in only a few types of lines, and are usually only on the second part of a compound word.

Stress indicators are usually assigned thus: primary stress (/), secondary stress (\), and unstressed (x). This is the most common way to assign the rhythm and to determine the type-line, or foot.

Sievers-type lines 

After applying the appropriate arsis or thesis to a line, we look at the rhythm that the markings make and assign a type-line, or foot, to the half-line. Eduard Sievers created type-lines based on the metrical patterns that he saw in Old English poetry, and named them in alphabetical order according to the most frequently used. There are five basic line types, A,B,C,D, and E, and each have their own metrical pattern. Daniel Paul O'Donnell reproduces a very handy traditional mnemonic for helping remember the basic line-types:

Type A ( / × / ×) (Trochaic) — Anna angry
Type B ( × / × / ) (Iambic) — And Bryhtnoth bold
Type C (× / / ×) (Spondaic) — In keen conflict
Type D ( / / \ ×) — Drive Don backwards
Type E ( / \ × /) — Each one with edge

There are numerous subtypes of these lines, as outlined in Cassidy & Ringler and elsewhere. The line types above are in alphabetical order of the most frequently used type-lines in the Old English corpus.

Other scansion systems 

Another metrical system was put forward by John C. Pope in which rhythmic stress is assigned using musical patterns. This system seems to make more sense when considering that the poetry of the Anglo-Saxons was set to music. An explanation of the Pope system is also included in Cassidy & Ringler and in Eight Old English Poems.

Use of Anglo-Saxon poetic line in reconstructing documents 
The theory of Old English metre has become an obsession for many scholars, such as Sievers, but what does it all mean in the overall study of Old English poetry? As mentioned above, the fact that the structure of Old English poetry is so rigid and formulaic is an incredibly useful tool for extrapolating meaning from damaged or poorly transcribed manuscripts. For example, the first part of the “Finnsburg Fragment” is missing, but by using these basic metric ideas, at what some of the words of the last half-line can be guessed:

oððe hwæþer ðǣra hyssa * * * * *
or whether of the young men * * * * *

First, the most important word in the first half-line is looked at, "hyssa" or "young men." Since the first syllable has an h, and "hwæþer" also has an h in the first syllable, that the "h" syllables are the ones to be alliterated can be guessed. Just from that knowledge of alliteration can be guessed that the alliterated word in the lost second half line will contain a "h" syllable as well.

Just using a basic understanding of the alliterative verse can give a clue as to what the word might be. The type lines are also used to determine the lost words if only one or two words are missing, and the place of the alliterator and the stressed syllables is known. Extrapolating can find a word that may fit into the missing fragment. A knowledge of paleography and the scribe’s penmanship is also useful; words that would be too long or too short to make something fit can be ruled out.

See also
 Alliterative verse
 Old English poetry
 Kaluza's law

References 

Old English poetry
English phonology